The Kinyoun method or Kinyoun stain (cold method), developed by Joseph J. Kinyoun, is a procedure used to stain acid-fast species of the bacterial genus Mycobacterium. It is a variation of a method developed by Robert Koch in 1882. Certain species of bacteria have a waxy lipid called mycolic acid, in their cell walls which allow them to be stained with Acid-Fast better than a Gram-Stain. The  unique ability  of  mycobacteria  to  resist  decolorization  by acid-alcohol  is  why  they  are  termed  acid-fast. It involves the application of a primary stain (basic fuchsin), a decolorizer (acid-alcohol), and a counterstain (methylene blue). Unlike the Ziehl–Neelsen stain (Z-N stain), the Kinyoun method of staining does not require heating. In the Ziehl–Neelsen stain, heat acts as a physical mordant while phenol (carbol of carbol fuchsin) acts as the chemical mordant. Since the Kinyoun stain is a cold method (no heat applied), the concentration of carbol fuschin used is increased.

Staining procedure

Make an acid-fast stain

Materials 

 Slide with organism smear
 Carbol Fuchsin
 Acid-Alcohol
 Methylene blue
 bibulous paper
 Microscope

Instructions 

 Make smear on a slide with organisms
 Clean slide, wax label slide, spread organism, air dry for 10 minutes, heat fix
 Dip slide into Carbol Fuchsin for 20 minutes.
 Rinse slide
 Dip slide into Acid-alcohol for 3–5 seconds.
 Rinse Slide
 Dip slide into Methylene blue for 30 seconds.
 Rinse Slide
 Blot slide dry with bibulous paper.
 Observe under Microscope.

Modification 
The Kinyoun method can be modified as a weak acid fast stain, which uses 0.5–1.0% sulfuric acid instead of hydrochloric acid. The weak acid fast stain, in addition to staining Mycobacteria, will also stain organisms that are not able to maintain the carbol fuchsin after decolorizing with HCl, such as Nocardia species and Cryptosporidium.

See also
 Auramine-rhodamine stain

References

Bacteriology
Staining
Microscopy

pt:Coloração de Kinyoun